Odebolt is a city in Sac County, Iowa, United States. The population was 994 at the time of the 2020 census.

History
Odebolt was platted in 1877 when the Chicago & Northwestern Railway was extended to that point. Odebolt was incorporated as a city May 13, 1878.

While the etymology of Odebolt's unusual name is unquestioned — being named after the Odebolt Creek — the etymology of the creek's name is disputed.  It has been ascribed to a story of a French fur trapper and to multiple stories of a bolt falling in the creek.  The trapper's name was reportedly Odebeau, and his name corrupted.

Geography
Odebolt is located at  (42.310416, -95.251354). Odebolt Creek arises near here, flows through Ida Grove, then into the Maple River.

Demographics

2010 census
As of the census of 2010, there were 1,013 people, 433 households, and 269 families living in the city. The racial makeup of the city was 98.5% White, 0.2% African American, 0.2% Native American, 0.1% Asian, 0.8% from other races, and 0.2% from two or more races. Hispanic or Latino of any race were 1.8% of the population.

There were 433 households, of which 26.3% had children under the age of 18 living with them, 52.9% were married couples living together, 6.0% had a female householder with no husband present, 3.2% had a male householder with no wife present, and 37.9% were non-families. 34.6% of all households were made up of individuals, and 20.1% had someone living alone who was 65 years of age or older. The average household size was 2.26 and the average family size was 2.89.

The median age in the city was 45 years. 23.6% of residents were under the age of 18; 5.8% were between the ages of 18 and 24; 20.5% were from 25 to 44; 26.2% were from 45 to 64; and 23.8% were 65 years of age or older. The gender makeup of the city was 47.8% male and 52.2% female.

2000 census
As of the census of 2000, there were 1,153 people, 467 households, and 296 families living in the city. The racial makeup of the city was 99.22% white.

There were 467 households, out of which 27.4% had children under the age of 18 living with them, 56.1% were married couples living together, 5.4% had a female householder with no husband present, and 36.6% were non-families. 34.7% of all households were made up of individuals, and 23.1% had someone living alone who was 65 years of age or older. The average household size was 2.30 and the average family size was 2.99.

In the city, the population was spread out, with 23.4% under the age of 18, 4.9% from 18 to 24, 22.8% from 25 to 44, 18.8% from 45 to 64, and 30.0% who were 65 years of age or older. The median age was 44 years. For every 100 females, there were 87.5 males. For every 100 females age 18 and over, there were 82.4 males.

The median income for a household in the city was $30,208, and the median income for a family was $40,917. Males had a median income of $30,000 versus $18,438 for females. The per capita income for the city was $15,971. About 7.6% of families and 9.5% of the population were below the poverty line, including 14.9% of those under age 18 and 10.3% of those age 65 or over.

Education
Odebolt is a part of the Odebolt–Arthur–Battle Creek–Ida Grove Community School District. It was a part of the Odebolt–Arthur Community School District, until its merger with the Battle Creek–Ida Grove Community School District on July 1, 2018. Schools serving the community include OABCIG Elementary Odebolt, OABCIG Middle School in Odebolt, and OABCIG High School in Ida Grove.

References

External links

 
City of Odebolt
Odebolt History Pages
City-Data Comprehensive statistical data and more about Odebolt

Cities in Sac County, Iowa
Cities in Iowa